Clarkstown High School North is a high school located in New City, New York, United States, educating students in grades 9 through 12. It is one of two high schools in the Clarkstown Central School District (CCSD). Since 2006, North has offered the International Baccalaureate Diploma Programme to juniors and seniors.

In 2015 U.S. News & World Report ranked Clarkstown North Senior High School with a silver award as the 135 Best High School in New York State and 1,329 nationally.

The town of Clarkstown recognizes January 25 as Clarkstown Rams Football Day, as of 1994.

Buildings
Clarkstown North consists of three buildings: the Main building, the Annex, and the X-wing or New building.

Main
The original building of Clarkstown High School North is the Main, which is built off an early 1900s mansion.  Before the construction of Clarkstown High School South, this was the only high school in the Clarkstown Central School District.  The Main has the language department, the English department, some of the science rooms, the filmmaking studio, a two-room writer's lab, a two-story library, a large gym with boys and girls locker rooms, a smaller gym that serves as the wrestling room, an auditorium and theater department, an orchestra room, a courtyard, a large lunchroom, a special education program, and a bomb shelter. It is the largest building in the school.

Annex
The second building is commonly referred to as the "Annex" and was completed by the 1960–61 school year. Before Felix Festa Middle School was constructed, the Annex was the school district's junior high school. However, the two buildings were not connected, so for a long time students had to walk outside to get from class to class. The Annex is built on a hill and has three floors. The top floor is referred to as the fifth floor, the one right below it in the middle of the hill is the fourth floor, and the bottom floor is the third. The third floor has science rooms, the fourth has math rooms, and the fifth has more math rooms, health rooms, study halls, a small gym with locker rooms, two small cafeterias, and the guidance office.

During the 1980s, classrooms were built in trailers called "The Mobiles." The Mobiles had been put up in 1985 during the construction of the new library in the Main. These were demolished before the start of the 2009–10 school year.

X-Wing
The new building extension was built during the 2004–2005 school year. This expansion, called officially the "X-Wing" and more colloquially, the "New," connected the "Main" and "Annex" buildings, and also added many classrooms. The building stands on two floors consisting of specialty classrooms, including a new band room on the top floor, and art rooms on the bottom floor, as well as many social studies classrooms. The bottom floor is referred to as the sixth floor, and the top is referred to as the seventh. The building was intended to have air conditioning, but the budget was apparently not met.

Vermin problem and Halloween 2007 walkout

On October 31, 2007, Clarkstown High School North students, ranging from 9th to 12th grade, held a walk-out to protest the sanitary conditions of the school. The protest started in front of the annex building and students walked to the far ball field. They chanted and held signs from approximately 12:20pm to 1:00pm while a news helicopter hovered above.

This was the largest walkout in district history. The other previous walkout was in 1975 and happened because students were against the new rules regarding study halls.

Originally, Clarkstown North Students were planning to walk to Town Hall, in the heart of New City, New York. The plan was quickly scrapped as Clarkstown Police Department threatened to arrest anyone who left school grounds on account that it was unlawful assembly and the students could quickly turn into a riot.

At an emergency school board meeting the next evening, students and parents spoke about the conditions at Clarkstown North. The meeting ran from 7:30pm to 11:30pm. It was revealed that there were over 700 recorded absent students during the walkout, far more than the estimated 200–300. The following day, there was a meeting immediately after school for all students to discuss ways to improve Clarkstown North.

Field renovation
In June of the 2007–2008 school year, construction began on the football field and track. The track and playing field were replaced by a new rubber track and artificial-turf football field. The renovations were scheduled to be finished by the start of the 2008–2009 school year, but were completed on October 25, 2008.

The turf undertook its most recent renovations in the spring of 2020. The turf was removed and replaced with new, alternating tones of green and purple end zones.

Athletics
The school offers a variety of varsity and junior varsity sports, and competes as part of Section One of the New York State Public High School Athletic Association. Clarkstown North's rival schools include Clarkstown South, the other senior high school in the Clarkstown Central School District. The winner of the annual football game between the two schools is awarded the Supervisor's Cup. Despite the inherent rivalry, Clarkstown North and Clarkstown South compete together as one "Clarkstown" team in several varsity sports such as ice hockey, skiing, and swimming/diving.

The varsity baseball team won the 2002 Class A New York State championship.

Ram's Cave 
In the spring of the 2010–2011 school year, the Ram's Cave was created at North. This is a small school store in the Main that sells snacks, beverages, and school spirit wear to all students in the afternoons. Members of the PTA volunteer to manage the store. In the fall of the 2012–2013 school year, the Ram's Cave was relocated and expanded into the library of the School.

Notable alumni

 Bruce Altman (class of 1973), film and television actor
 Skylar Astin (class of 2005), actor, "Georg" in Tony Award-winning musical Spring Awakening, and "Jesse" in movie Pitch Perfect
Keith Bulluck (class of 1995), linebacker for NFL's New York Giants
 Will Cunnane (class of 1992), Major League Baseball pitcher
 Brittny Gastineau (class of 2001?), model and television actress
 Mark Katz (class of 1982), speechwriter for President Bill Clinton
 Alan Kirschenbaum (class of 1979), television producer and writer
 Dana Marlowe, social entrepreneur, philanthropist, women rights activist and disability advocate
 Chris O'Grady, left-handed pitcher for the Miami Marlins
 Adam Rodríguez (class of 1993), film and television actor, known for role as Eric Delko on CSI: Miami
 Philip Rosenthal (class of 1977), writer and executive producer of sitcom Everybody Loves Raymond
 Randi Weingarten (class of 1976), president of American Federation of Teachers (AFT), AFL–CIO, and former president of United Federation of Teachers
 Tracy Wolfson (class of 1993), sportscaster for CBS Sports
 Prince Emili (class of 2016), football defensive tackle for the New Orleans Saints of the National Football League (NFL).
 Julie Buxbaum (class of 1995), author

References

External links
 
 Clarkstown Central School District

Public high schools in New York (state)
Educational institutions established in 1953
Schools in Rockland County, New York
1953 establishments in New York (state)